James Mishler (born in April, 1969) is an American writer and editor, working mostly in the adventure game and comic book industries.

Career
James Mishler was previously the associate editor of Comics & Games Retailer and Scrye, and later the managing editor of Comics & Games Retailer. Mishler formed a new company called Adventure Games Publishing with Bob Bledsaw. The company picked up the license to Judges Guild's Wilderlands setting after the license with Necromancer Games expired in late 2006. Mishler published Wilderlands books from 2007 to 2010, naming it the "Wilderlands of High Adventure", expanding the campaign setting and changing the focus from swords & sorcery to epic high fantasy. Adventure Games Publishing closed on March 8, 2010, following the publication of 100 Street Vendors of the City State (2010), which Mishler said sold only two print copies and 13 PDF copies.

During his career in the adventure game industry, James has worked for Andon Unlimited; Wizards of the Coast; Chessex Distribution; West End Games; Kenzer & Company; ACD Distribution; Krause Publications, as an associate editor on Scrye magazine; WizKids; and, since 2004, F&W Publications, as an associate editor on Comics Buyer's Guide, news editor on Scrye, and managing editor on Comics & Games Retailer, where he remains today.

James Mishler was managing editor of Comics & Games Retailer until it ceased publication in 2007.

References

1969 births
20th-century American journalists
American magazine editors
American male journalists
Living people